In optimization theory, semi-infinite programming (SIP) is an optimization problem with a finite number of variables and an infinite number of constraints, or an infinite number of variables and a finite number of constraints. In the former case the constraints are typically parameterized.

Mathematical formulation of the problem
The problem can be stated simply as:

where

SIP can be seen as a special case of bilevel programs in which the lower-level variables do not participate in the objective function.

Methods for solving the problem

In the meantime, see external links below for a complete tutorial.

Examples

In the meantime, see external links below for a complete tutorial.

See also
 Optimization
 Generalized semi-infinite programming (GSIP)

References

 Edward J. Anderson and Peter Nash, Linear Programming in Infinite-Dimensional Spaces, Wiley, 1987.
 
 M. A. Goberna and M. A. López, Linear Semi-Infinite Optimization, Wiley, 1998.
 
 David Luenberger (1997). Optimization by Vector Space Methods. John Wiley & Sons.  .
 Rembert Reemtsen and Jan-J. Rückmann (Editors), Semi-Infinite Programming (Nonconvex Optimization and Its Applications). Springer, 1998, 1998

External links
 Description of semi-infinite programming from INFORMS (Institute for Operations Research and Management Science).
 A complete, free, open source Semi Infinite Programming Tutorial is available here from Elsevier as a pdf download from their Journal of Computational and Applied Mathematics, Volume 217, Issue 2, 1 August 2008, Pages 394–419

Optimization in vector spaces
Approximation theory
Numerical analysis